Theodore L. Kramer (1847 – March 2, 1910) was an American soldier who fought in the American Civil War. Kramer received his country's highest award for bravery during combat, the Medal of Honor. Kramer's medal was won for his actions in the Battle of Chapin's Farm, Virginia, on September 29, 1864. He was honored with the award on April 6, 1865.

Kramer was born in Luzerne County, Pennsylvania, and entered service in Danville. He was buried in Elmhurst, Illinois.

Medal of Honor citation

See also
List of American Civil War Medal of Honor recipients: G–L

References

1847 births
1910 deaths
American Civil War recipients of the Medal of Honor
Burials in Illinois
People from Luzerne County, Pennsylvania
People of Pennsylvania in the American Civil War
Union Army soldiers
United States Army Medal of Honor recipients